Jader da Silva Brazeiro (born 21 February 1984), commonly known as Jader, is a Brazilian retired footballer and current scout of Metalist Kharkiv.

References

External links
 

1984 births
Living people
Brazilian footballers
Brazilian expatriate footballers
Expatriate footballers in Iran
Naft Tehran F.C. players
FC Arsenal Kharkiv players
FC Volyn Lutsk players
FC Metalist Kharkiv players
Ukrainian Premier League players
Ukrainian First League players
Expatriate footballers in Ukraine
Brazilian expatriate sportspeople in Ukraine
Association football midfielders
Footballers from Porto Alegre